Polina Mukhgaleeva (born 14 October 1991) is a Russian slalom canoeist who has competed at the international level since 2008.

She won three medals at the ICF Canoe Slalom World Championships with a silver (Extreme K1: 2019) and two bronzes (Extreme K1: 2018, C1 team: 2021).

World Cup individual podiums

1 World Championship counting for World Cup points

References

External links

Living people
Russian female canoeists
Medalists at the ICF Canoe Slalom World Championships
1991 births